Robert Roman Kraskowski (born December 21, 1967 in Słupsk) is a Polish sport shooter. Kraskowski had won a total of three medals at the ISSF World Cup circuit, including gold for the 10 m air rifle (1992 in Suhl, Germany). He also competed in the rifle shooting events at the 1992 Summer Olympics in Barcelona (only 10 m air rifle), and at the 1996 Summer Olympics in Atlanta.

Twelve years after competing in his last Olympics, Kraskowski qualified for his third Polish team as a 41-year-old at the 2008 Summer Olympics in Beijing by placing sixth for the 10 m air rifle (AR40) from the third meet of the 2006 ISSF World Cup in Munich, Germany. Kraskowski also received additional places for the 50 m rifle prone (FR60PR) and 50 m rifle 3 positions (STR3X20); therefore, he competed for all rifle shooting events.

In his first event, 10 m air rifle, Kraskowski was able to hit a total of 589 points within six attempts, finishing thirty-third in the qualifying rounds. Few days later, he placed twenty-fifth in the 50 m rifle prone, by one target ahead of India's Sanjeev Rajput from the final attempt, with a total score of 591 points. In his third and last event, 50 m rifle 3 positions, Kraskowski was able to shoot 395 targets in a prone position, 373 in standing, and 388 in kneeling, for a total score of 1,156 points, finishing only in thirty-third place.

Olympic results

References

External links
ISSF Profile
NBC 2008 Olympics profile 

Polish male sport shooters
Living people
Olympic shooters of Poland
Shooters at the 1992 Summer Olympics
Shooters at the 1996 Summer Olympics
Shooters at the 2008 Summer Olympics
Sportspeople from Słupsk
1967 births